American actress Uma Thurman wore a Prada dress in lavender chiffon to the 67th Academy Awards on March 27, 1995, at which she was nominated for Best Supporting Actress for Pulp Fiction. The dress was designed by American designer Barbara Tfank. 

The dress was well-received by contemporary critics, and in retrospect is considered one of Thurman's most memorable red carpet looks. Variety magazine's 2003 Complete Book of Oscar Fashion described it as "the gown that launched a thousand imitations"; and indeed, a year later, Nicole Kidman wore a Prada dress of an identical colour at the 68th Academy Awards. In a 2011 retrospective of Oscars dresses, CNN called the color "exquisite" and highlighted the delicacy of the chiffon.

The appearance of the dress on the red carpet has been credited with bringing Prada's clothing into the mainstream in America. The brand had previously been relatively obscure, best known for making high-end accessories, particularly their black backpacks.

See also
 List of individual dresses
 Crimson Alberta Ferretti dress of Uma Thurman

References

1990s fashion
Outfits worn at the Academy Awards ceremonies
Prada
Prada, Thurman